Events from the year 1792 in the United States.

Incumbents

Federal Government 
 President: George Washington (no political party-Virginia)
 Vice President: John Adams (F-Massachusetts)
 Chief Justice: John Jay (New York)
 Speaker of the House of Representatives: Jonathan Trumbull, Jr. (Pro-Admin.-Connecticut)
 Congress: 2nd

Events

January–March
 February 20 – The Postal Service Act, establishing the United States Post Office Department, is signed by President George Washington.
 March 20 – A new capital of North Carolina and county seat of the newly formed Wake County is established after North Carolina State Senator and surveyor William Christmas submits his design for the city. A few months later the capital is officially named Raleigh in honor of Sir Walter Raleigh.

April–June
 April 2 – The Coinage Act is passed establishing the United States Mint.
 April 5 – United States President George Washington vetoes a bill designed to apportion representatives among U.S. states. This is the first time the presidential veto is used in the United States.
 May 10 – Union Bank is founded in Boston. In 1925 it merges with State Street Trust Company, now known as the State Street Corporation
 May 11 – Robert Gray's Columbia River expedition: Captain Robert Gray becomes the first explorer to enter the Columbia River.
 May 17 – The Buttonwood Agreement is signed, beginning the New York Stock Exchange.
 June 1 – Kentucky becomes the 15th state of The United States of America (see History of Kentucky).
 June 4 – Isaac Shelby is inaugurated as the first governor of Kentucky.
June 9 – Denmark recognizes the independence of the United States.

October–December
 October 12 – The first Columbus Day celebration in the United States is held in New York City, 300 years after his arrival in the New World.
 October 13 – Foundation of Washington, D.C.: The cornerstone of the United States Executive Mansion, known as the White House after 1818, is laid.
 October 29 – Mount Hood (Oregon) is named after British Admiral Lord Hood by Lt. William Broughton of the Vancouver Expedition, who spots the mountain near the mouth of the Willamette River.
 December 3 – George Washington is re-elected President of the United States.

Undated
 George Anschutz constructs the first blast furnace in Pittsburgh, Pennsylvania.
 Shiloh Meeting House, predecessor of Shiloh United Methodist Church in Lynchburg, Virginia, is founded.
 Pearson & Sons bakery, earliest predecessor of Nabisco, opens in Massachusetts.

Ongoing
 Northwest Indian War (1785–1795)

Births
 February 15 – Floride Calhoun, Second Lady of the U.S. as wife of John C. Calhoun (died 1866)
 March 4 
 Isaac Lea, conchologist, geologist, and publisher (died 1886)
 Samuel Slocum, inventor (died 1861)
 April 4 – Thaddeus Stevens, politician (died 1868)
 May 10 – Willie Person Mangum, politician (died 1861)
 June 13 – William Austin Burt, inventor ("Father of the typewriter") (died 1858)
 July 10 – George M. Dallas, 11th Vice President of the United States from 1845 to 1849 (died 1864)
 September 1 – Chester Harding, portrait painter (died 1866)
 September 7 – David J. Baker, U.S. Senator from Illinois in 1830 (died 1869)
 September 19 – William Backhouse Astor, Sr., business tycoon (died 1875)
 September 22 – John James Appleton, diplomat, born in France (died 1864)
 November 10 – Samuel Nelson, Associate Justice of the Supreme Court of the United States (died 1873)
 November 15 – Isaac Toucey, U.S. Senator from Connecticut from 1851 to 1857 (died 1869)
 November 26 – Sarah Grimké, abolitionist and suffragist (died 1873)
 December 5 – James Guthrie, U.S. Senator from Kentucky from 1865 to 1868 (died 1869)
 Date unknown – Robert H. Adams, U.S. Senator from Mississippi in 1830 (died 1830)

Deaths
 February 15 – John Witherspoon, signatory of the Declaration of Independence (born 1723)
 April 4 – James Sykes, delegate to the Continental Congress (born 1725)
 May 10 – John Stevens, New Jersey delegate to the Continental Congress (born c.1715)
 July 18 – John Paul Jones, sailor and the U.S.'s first well-known naval fighter in the American Revolution (born 1747 in Great Britain)
 October 7 – George Mason, patriot, statesman and delegate (born 1725)
 December 8 – Henry Laurens, 5th President of the Continental Congress, signatory of the Articles of Confederation, father of John Laurens (born 1724)

See also
Timeline of United States history (1790–1819)

References

Further reading
 Edward Thornton. The United States through English Spectacles in 1792–1794. The Pennsylvania Magazine of History and Biography, Vol. 9, No. 2 (July, 1885), pp. 214–222.
 Narrative of John Heckewelder's Journey to the Wabash in 1792. The Pennsylvania Magazine of History and Biography, Vol. 12, No. 2 (July, 1888), pp. 165–184.
 Lists of Foreigners Who Arrived at Philadelphia, 1791–1792. The Pennsylvania Magazine of History and Biography, Vol. 24, No. 2 (1900), pp. 187–194.
 Max Farrand. The First Hayburn Case, 1792. The American Historical Review, Vol. 13, No. 2 (January, 1908), pp. 281–285.
 F. W. Howay, T. C. Elliott. Voyages of the "Jenny" to Oregon, 1792–94. Oregon Historical Quarterly, Vol. 30, No. 3 (September, 1929), pp. 197–206.
 J. Neilson Barry. Broughton, up Columbia River, 1792. Oregon Historical Quarterly, Vol. 32, No. 4 (December, 1931), pp. 301–312.
 Lawrence Kinnaird. The Significance of William Augustus Bowles' Seizure of Panton's Apalachee Store in 1792. The Florida Historical Society Quarterly, Vol. 9, No. 3 (January, 1931), pp. 156–192.
 J. Neilson Barry. Columbia River Exploration, 1792. Oregon Historical Quarterly, Vol. 33, No. 1 (March, 1932), pp. 31–42.
 Harold Kirker. The New Theater, Philadelphia, 1791–1792. Journal of the Society of Architectural Historians, Vol. 22, No. 1 (March, 1963), pp. 36–37.
 Loren K. Ruff. Joseph Harper and Boston's Board Alley Theatre, 1792–1793. Educational Theatre Journal, Vol. 26, No. 1 (March, 1974), pp. 45–52.
 James P. Whittenburg. "The Common Farmer (Number 2)": Herman Husband's Plan for Peace between the United States and the Indians, 1792. The William and Mary Quarterly, Third Series, Vol. 34, No. 4 (October, 1977), pp. 647–650.
 R. David Edmunds. "Nothing Has Been Effected": The Vincennes Treaty of 1792. Indiana Magazine of History, Vol. 74, No. 1 (March 1978), pp. 23–35.
 Helen Hornbeck Tanner. The Glaize in 1792: A Composite Indian Community. Ethnohistory, Vol. 25, No. 1 (Winter, 1978), pp. 15–39.
 James P. Walsh. "Mechanics and Citizens": The Connecticut Artisan Protest of 1792. The William and Mary Quarterly, Third Series, Vol. 42, No. 1 (January, 1985), pp. 66–89.
 Michael L. Kennedy. A French Jacobin Club in Charleston, South Carolina, 1792–1795. The South Carolina Historical Magazine, Vol. 91, No. 1 (January, 1990), pp. 4–22.
 Don Alexander Hawkins. The Landscape of the Federal City: A 1792 Walking Tour. Washington History, Vol. 3, No. 1, Special Bicentennial Issue: Washington D.C., 1791–1991 (Spring/Summer, 1991), pp. 10–33.
 David J. Cowen. The First Bank of the United States and the Securities Market Crash of 1792. The Journal of Economic History, Vol. 60, No. 4 (December, 2000), pp. 1041–1060.
 Jim Mockford. Before Lewis and Clark, Lt. Broughton's River of Names: The Columbia River Exploration of 1792. Oregon Historical Quarterly, Vol. 106, No. 4 (Winter, 2005), pp. 542–567.

External links
 

 
1790s in the United States
United States
United States
Years of the 18th century in the United States